The Montezuma Schoolhouse, at 5375 Webster St. in Montezuma, Colorado, was built as a rural schoolhouse in 1884.  It was listed on the National Register of Historic Places in 2007.

It is a  one-room schoolhouse, funded by three bond issues which, combined, raised $1,300 in 1883.

References

Schools in Colorado
National Register of Historic Places in Summit County, Colorado
School buildings completed in 1884
School buildings on the National Register of Historic Places in Colorado
One-room schoolhouses in Colorado